The Origin is a biographical novel of the life of Charles Darwin written by Irving Stone.  Darwin was a geologist and biologist, and could be considered the father of evolutionary theory.  The novel begins with Darwin at the age of 22 and follows him through the Voyage of the Beagle until his death in 1882.

Stone took five years to research and write the novel and consulted numerous Darwin scholars and even Darwin's descendants in order to write his version of Darwin's life.

References
Stone, I (1980) The Origin, Doubleday. 
Stephen Jay Gould. On Telling, Altering and Enriching Stories: An Unpublished Darwin Letter from a Key Incident in his Later Life. Evolutionary Paleobiology (David Jablonski, Douglas H. Erwin and Jere H. Lipps, editors),  pp. 437–460; University of Chicago Press, 1996. .

1980 American novels
Historical novels
Biographical novels
Novels by Irving Stone
Cultural depictions of Charles Darwin
Novels set in the 19th century
Doubleday (publisher) books